Mesivta Nesivos Hatalmud, is a Yeshiva based in the Borough Park area in Brooklyn, N.Y. 
Nesivos Hatalmud was founded in 2005 by Rabbi Shmuel Mordechai Wolner and assumed his current post as Rosh Yeshiva.
In winter 2014 he founded Yeshiva Gedolah Nesivos Hatalmud.

References 

Orthodox yeshivas in Brooklyn